The following television stations operate on virtual channel 56 in the United States:

 K29GO-D in Cortez, etc., Colorado
 KDOC-TV in Anaheim, California
 KETK-TV in Jacksonville, Texas
 KQHO-LD in Houston, Texas
 KSXF-LD in Sioux Falls, South Dakota
 KWDK in Tacoma, Washington
 W24EC-D in Manteo, North Carolina
 WBXZ-LD in Buffalo, New York
 WDKY-TV in Danville, Kentucky
 WFSG in Panama City, Florida
 WLVI in Cambridge, Massachusetts
 WOLF-TV in Hazleton, Pennsylvania
 WOPX-TV in Melbourne, Florida
 WSPX-TV in Syracuse, New York
 WTVS in Detroit, Michigan
 WVUX-LD in Fairmont, West Virginia
 WWVW-LD in Wheeling, West Virginia
 WYIN in Gary, Indiana

References

56 virtual